The Mayon Volcano Natural Park is a protected area of the Philippines located in the Bicol Region (Region 5) on southeast Luzon Island, the largest island of the country. The volcano is also renowned for having an almost perfect cone. First protected as a National Park in 1938, it was reclassified as a Natural Park in the year 2000.

Geography
Mayon Volcano Natural Park encompasses an area of  located in the eight cities and municipalities that has jurisdiction of the mountain. These communities are Camalig, Daraga, Guinobatan, Legazpi City, Ligao City, Tabaco City, Malilipot, and Santo Domingo, all in the province of Albay.

History
In 1992, the Republic Act No. 7586 or the National Integrated Protected Areas System (NIPAS) Act was established to create, designate, classify and administered by the Department of Environment and Natural Resources, all the protected areas of the country for the present and future generations of the Filipino people. Under NIPAS, the Mayon Volcano National Park was reclassified and renamed as Mayon Volcano Natural Park with the signing of Proclamation No. 412 on November 21, 2000.

Image gallery

See also
List of protected areas of the Philippines

References

Natural parks of the Philippines
Geography of Albay
Landmarks in the Philippines
Tourist attractions in Albay
Protected areas established in 1938
1938 establishments in the Philippines